was a district located in Hidaka Subprefecture, Hokkaido, Japan.

In 2004, the district had an estimated population of 22,581 and a density of 28.17 persons per km2. The total area was 801.51 km2.

On March 31, 2006, Shizunai District merged with Mitsuishi District to create the newly created Hidaka District. Mitsuishi District and Shizunai District were both dissolved with this merger.

Towns and villages
 Shizunai

Former districts of Hokkaido